Events in the year 2023 in Somalia.

Incumbents 
 President: Hassan Sheikh Mohamud
 Prime Minister: Hamza Abdi Barre
 Speaker of the House: Abdi Hashi Abdullahi

Events 
Ongoing – Somali Civil War (2009–present) (2023 timeline of the Somali Civil War); COVID-19 pandemic in Somalia

January 
 4 January – Mahas bombings: 35 people are killed and many others wounded by al-Shabaab jihadists in a double car bombing in Mahas District, Hiran.
 6 January – 
 Al-Shabaab gunmen storm a village in Hirshabelle State, killing at least six people. The village was captured from al-Shabab last week.
 At least 20 people are killed and many more injured during an ambush by al-Shabaab insurgents at a government base at the Hilowle Gaab village.
16 January – 
The Somali Armed Forces claim it recaptured the port town of Harardhere from Al-Shabaab militants.
According to a Puntland officer, Somali forces allied with regional militias also took the town of El Dhere.
17 January – Seven soldiers, including a commander, are killed when al-Shabaab terrorists attack a base in Hawadley with a suicide car bomb and gunmen.
26 January – A U.S. military raid in northern Somalia kills senior Islamic State member Bilal al-Sudani and ten other insurgents. No U.S. military casualties are reported in the operation, which was ordered by U.S. President Joe Biden.

Deaths 

 26 January – Bilal al-Sudani, terrorist.

See also 

 2023 in Somaliland
 COVID-19 pandemic in Africa

References 

 
Somalia
Somalia
2020s in Somalia
Years of the 21st century in Somalia